Takahiro Saito (born 21 November 1990 in Ibaraki, Japan) is a Japanese professional footballer who is last known to have played for Lao Toyota FC of the Lao Premier League.

Career 
Recording 27 appearances for Albirex Niigata S in 2015, Saito then completed a transfer to perennial Lao Premier League title contenders Lao Toyota FC in 2016, thanking his teammates and staff for their support.

Trophies 
 Singapore Cup(1): 2015
 Singapore League Cup(1): 2015

References

External links 
 at Soccerway

Japanese expatriate footballers
Singapore Premier League players
Association football defenders
1990 births
Japanese footballers
Expatriate footballers in Singapore
Living people
Expatriate footballers in Laos
Albirex Niigata Singapore FC players